Epeolus is a genus of cuckoo bees of the tribe Epeolini, the subfamily Nomadinae part of the honey bee family Apidae. They are often known as variegated cuckoo-bees.

Biology
The species within Epeolus are medium-sized bees with bright patterns. There are currently approximately 100 species described from throughout the world. All known species of Epeolus are cleptoparasites of mining bees of the genus Colletes. The female enters the nesting excavated by the female Colletes bee and lays an egg in an unsealed cell. The Epeolus larva then consumes the egg of the host bee and then feeds on the pollen the Colletes bee provisioned the cell with for her offspring. Epeolus bees may be rather obvious and easily observed in the vicinity of the nesting aggregations of their hosts and often use the same flowers to feed on. Colletes bees line their nesting cells with a cellophane like covering which they exude from the Dufour's gland to protect the cell from moisture and fungal infection, female Epeolus bees have spines on the end of their abdomens which they use to pierce u-shaped holes in this covering so that she can oviposit between its layers, she also secretes a small amount of glue so that the egg adheres to the cell.

Species
The following species are currently classified in the genus Epeolus:

 
Epeolus ainsliei Crawford, 1932
Epeolus alatus Friese, 1922
Epeolus alpinus Friese, 1893
Epeolus amabilis Gerstäcker, 1869
Epeolus americanus (Cresson, 1878)
Epeolus anticus (Walker, 1871)
Epeolus arciferus Cockerell, 1924
Epeolus asperatus Cockerell, 1909
Epeolus asperrima (Moure, 1954)
Epeolus assamensis Meade-Waldo, 1913
Epeolus aureovestitus Dours, 1873
Epeolus australis Mitchell, 1962
Epeolus autumnalis Robertson, 1902
Epeolus banksi (Cockerell, 1907)
Epeolus barberiellus Cockerell, 1907
Epeolus beulahensis Cockerell, 1904
Epeolus bifasciatus Cresson, 1864
Epeolus bischoffi (Mavromoustakis, 1954)
Epeolus boliviensis Friese, 1908
Epeolus caffer (Lepeletier, 1841)
Epeolus canadensis Mitchell, 1962
Epeolus carioca (Moure, 1954)
Epeolus carolinus Mitchell, 1962
Epeolus cestus Eardley, 1991
Epeolus claripennis Friese, 1908
Epeolus collaris Pérez, 1895
Epeolus compactus Cresson, 1878
Epeolus compar Alfken, 1937
Epeolus coreanus Yasumatsu, 1933
Epeolus corniculatus Bischoff, 1923
Epeolus cruciger (Panzer, 1799)
Epeolus crucis Cockerell, 1904
Epeolus diodontus Cockerell, 1934
Epeolus erigeronis Mitchell, 1962
Epeolus fallax Morawitz, 1872
Epeolus fasciatus Friese, 1895
Epeolus fervidus Smith, 1879
Epeolus flavociliatus Friese, 1899
Epeolus flavofasciatus Smith, 1879
Epeolus floridensis Mitchell, 1962
Epeolus friesei Brauns, 1903
Epeolus fulviventris Bischoff, 1923
Epeolus fulvopilosus Cameron, 1902
Epeolus fumipennis Say, 1837
Epeolus gabrielis Cockerell, 1909
Epeolus gianellii Gribodo, 1894
Epeolus glabratus Cresson, 1878
Epeolus hitei Cockerell, 1908
Epeolus howardi Mitchell, 1962
Epeolus humillimus Cockerell, 1918
Epeolus ibericus Bogusch, 2018
Epeolus ilicis Mitchell, 1962
Epeolus intermedius Pérez, 1884
Epeolus interruptus Robertson, 1900
Epeolus iranicus Bogusch, 2021
Epeolus ishikawai Tadauchi & Schwarz, 1999
Epeolus japonicus Bischoff, 1930
Epeolus julliani Pérez, 1884
Epeolus kristenseni Friese, 1915
Epeolus lanhami Mitchell, 1962
Epeolus lectoides Robertson, 1901
Epeolus lectus Cresson, 1878
Epeolus luteipennis Friese, 1917
Epeolus lutzi Cockerell, 1921
Epeolus melectiformis Yasumatsu, 1938
Epeolus melectimimus Cockerell & Sandhouse, 1924
Epeolus mercatus Fabricius, 1804
Epeolus mesillae (Cockerell, 1895)
Epeolus minimus (Robertson, 1902)
Epeolus minutus Radoszkowski, 1888
Epeolus montanus (Cresson, 1878)
Epeolus natalensis Smith, 1879
Epeolus nigra (Michener, 1954)
Epeolus novomexicanus Cockerell, 1912
Epeolus odontothorax (Michener, 1954)
Epeolus olympiellus Cockerell, 1904
Epeolus peregrinus Cockerell, 1911
Epeolus pictus Nylander, 1848
Epeolus pilatei Cockerell, 1924
Epeolus priesneri Bogusch, 2021
Epeolus productuloides Bogusch, 2018
Epeolus productulus Bischoff, 1930
Epeolus productus Bischoff, 1930
Epeolus pubescens Cockerell, 1937
Epeolus pulchellus Cresson, 1865
Epeolus pusillus Cresson, 1864
Epeolus pygmaeorum Cockerell, 1932
Epeolus rubrostictus Cockerell & Sandhouse, 1924
Epeolus rufomaculatus Cockerell & Sandhouse, 1924
Epeolus rufothoracicus Bischoff, 1923
Epeolus rufulus Cockerell, 1941
Epeolus rugosus Cockerell, 1949
Epeolus schraderi (Michener, 1954)
Epeolus schummeli Schilling, 1849
Epeolus scutellaris Say, 1824
Epeolus seraxensis Radoszkowski, 1893
Epeolus siculus Giordani Soika, 1944
Epeolus sigillatus Alfken, 1930
Epeolus tarsalis Morawitz, 1874
Epeolus tibetanus Meade-Waldo, 1913
Epeolus transitorius Eversmann, 1852
Epeolus tristicolor Viereck, 1905
Epeolus tristis Smith, 1854
Epeolus tsushimensis Cockerell, 1926
Epeolus turcicus Bogusch, 2018
Epeolus variegatus (Linnaeus, 1758)
Epeolus variolosus (Holmberg, 1886)
Epeolus vernalis Mitchell, 1962
Epeolus vinogradovi Popov, 1952
Epeolus warnckei Bogusch, 2018
Epeolus weemsi Mitchell, 1962
Epeolus zonatus Smith, 1854

References

Nomadinae
Bee genera